The Chicago Community Trust (the Trust) is the community foundation serving Chicago, suburban Cook County, and the Illinois counties of DuPage, Kane, Lake, McHenry, and Will. Established on May 12, 1915, it is the third largest community foundation in the country as of 2019, with assets of more than $3.3 billion. The Trust awards more than $360 million annually in grants and has awarded more than $2 billion in grants since its founding. The Trust received gifts totaling almost $469 million during the 2019 fiscal year.

Mission 
The Chicago Community Trust mobilizes people, ideas, organizations and resources to advance equity, opportunity and prosperity for all.

In 2019, the Trust launched a ten-year strategic plan focused on addressing the region’s racial and ethnic wealth gap. The three-part strategy to close this gap centers around growing household wealth, catalyzing neighborhood investment and building collective power. In addition to this work, the Trust will continue to address the critical needs of the region and maximize the impact of philanthropic giving.

History 
The Chicago Community Trust was founded in 1915 by Norman Wait Harris, founder of the Harris Trust and Savings Bank, and his son Albert Wadsworth Harris.  The founders were inspired by The Cleveland Foundation, the world’s first community foundation, which was established the year before.  Most of the Trust’s funding during 1915-1930 focused on relief and humanitarian work for residents impacted by Chicago’s rapid industrialization. The Trust awarded its first grant in 1916, to United Charities for $5,000. The first major gift was from James A. Patton, “the grain king,” for $1 million in 1924.  The first bequest of $30,687 came two years later from the estate of Alex Demond.  In the early 1920s, the Trust commissioned landmark social surveys that identified the needs of those incarcerated at the Cook County Jail, immigrants, children with disabilities, single women, veterans, and the elderly.

During the Great Depression in the 1930s, Frank Loomis, executive director of the Trust, and Edward L. Ryerson Jr., Trust Executive Committee member, coordinated multiple relief drives through the Governor’s Commission on Unemployment and Relief and the Emergency Welfare Fund of Cook County. These drives raised $22 million from 1930-1933 and inspired the creation of multiple campaigns and funds, including the precursor to the United Way of Metropolitan Chicago.  The Trust made a grant to the 1933 Century of Progress world’s fair in Chicago, which was visited by nearly 40 million people.

Throughout the 1950s and 1960s, the Trust funded multiple cultural institutions and projects, including a design for the downtown lakefront along Grant Park and the creation of the Chicago Botanic Garden. It provided critical funds to schools, nurseries, and day care centers after the Our Lady of the Angels School Fire in 1958. In 1964, John G. Searle and Frances C. Searle became, and remain, the largest donors in the Trust’s history when they created the first Searle Fund at the Trust.

In 1976, the Trust awarded $3 million in grants to the Leadership Council for Metropolitan Open Communities to oversee the Gautreaux Housing Program. Considered the nation’s first “housing mobility program,” Gautreaux placed 7,100 low-income families into mixed-income neighborhoods.  In 2001, the Trust co-founded the Partnership for New Communities, which supported the largest and most ambitious public housing redevelopment in the country.  From 2000-2014, the Trust incubated several nonprofits, including Voices for Illinois Children and the IFF (formerly Illinois Facilities Fund). It also funded the Harris Theater for Music and Dance, 12th World Summit of Nobel Peace Laureates, Millennium Park, and the Burnham Plan Centennial.

From 2014-2015 the Trust celebrated its Centennial by partnering with multiple nonprofits and cultural institutions to organize new events in Chicago. In 2014, the Trust founded On the Table,  an annual one-day forum designed to elevate civic conversation and spark collective action. More than 250,000 people have participated since 2014, and more than 30 communities have replicated On the Table events. In 2015, the Trust partnered with the Chicago Public Library’s “One Book One Chicago” program,  Chicago Ideas Week, and the Chicago Humanities Festival to foster civic dialogue. Also, in 2015, it announced the SMART Growth Program – a capacity-building program for Cook County’s small arts and cultural organizations.

Philanthropic Services 

The Trust offers multiple ways for donors and their professional advisors to partner with the Trust including donor advised funds, endowment funds, supporting organizations, impact investing, and charitable estate planning services. The Trust also has the ability to facilitate gifts of complex assets ranging from business interests to real estate.

Governance Structure 

The Trust’s governing board is the Executive Committee which is made up of 17 community leaders who provide strategic and fiduciary oversight. The Trust’s structure includes both trust and corporate entities. The trust entity, The Chicago Community Trust, serves solely Cook County and administers the majority of its assets under the 1915 Declaration of Trust. Chief executives of Bank of America, BMO Harris Bank, JPMorgan Chase & Co., Northern Trust, and US Bank serve as trustees for these funds. The Trustees Committee also appoints members of the Trust Executive Committee and advises on development and community relations matters.

The corporate entity, The Chicago Community Foundation, has a broader geographic area of concern and offers flexibility with respect to the funds’ investment management and grant making. The Trust’s Executive Committee serves as the board of directors for The Chicago Community Foundation.

Financials 
As of September 30, 2019, the Trust’s consolidated assets totaled more than $3.3 billion. During the 2019 fiscal year, the Trust received $472 million in new gifts and made combined grant commitments totaling more than $369 million.

Grant Eligibility 
The Trust awards discretionary to organizations in Cook County, DuPage County, Kane County, Lake County, McHenry County, and Will County that benefit residents of the Chicago region that fulfill the charitable purposes of the Trust. The Trust also accepts applications from agencies that have a nonprofit fiscal sponsor. Each grant opportunity will have additional criteria for funding.

Geographic Affiliates and Supporting Organizations 
The Trust partners with three foundations that serve communities beyond Cook County, the county in which Chicago resides.

 The Community Foundation for McHenry County 
 The Lake County Community Foundation 
 The Community Foundation of Will County

Initiatives and Partnerships 
In addition to discretionary grants, the Trust offers grants through its three geographic affiliates and special initiatives and partnerships. Many of the Trust initiatives and programs have developed into stand-alone organizations addressing community needs, including the Campaign for Community Schools, Chicago High School for the Arts, Executive Service Corps of Chicago, IFF, Ingenuity, Leadership Greater Chicago, and Voices for Illinois Children.

Signature Initiatives 

 On the Table, launched in 2014, is an annual one-day forum designed to elevate civic conversation, foster new relationships, and inspire collaborative action across the Chicago regions. More than 250,000 people have participated since 2014 and more than 30 communities have replicated On the Table events.   
 Unity Fund was created in 2008 in response to the Great Recession’s economic toll on Chicago families and communities. The Unity Fund pools contributions from donors and distributes funds to area nonprofit organizations providing human services to vulnerable and under-resourced families.

Strategic Grant Making 

 Chicago-area Businesses of Color Partnership Fund: To fund promising new partnerships designed to improve and expand access to capital, high quality and specialized business service consultation, networks and industry specific supports for businesses in Chicagoland owned by people of color.
 Coalitions for Equity in Wealth Policy: To invest in strengthening existing coalitions that are creating the conditions to advance meaningful policy reforms. The Trust is interested in supporting coalitions engaging in three core policy areas: Assets and Income Policy, Lending and Consumer Protections Reform, and Equitable Public Sector Fines and Fees.  
 Open Call for Ideas: An invitation to anybody working on community investment to submit an idea related to a plan, investing in catalytic assets, financing development, or policy at any time.
 Flexible Funding: To support the community-based organizations at the “heart” of the neighborhood investment ecosystem.
 Changemakers Network: To strengthen community-led efforts in Chicago by improving the capacity of organizations and network leaders to solve the broad problems facing the region.
 Media Makers Initiative (launching mid-May): To develop new partnerships with hyperlocal, ethnic and community-centered media organizations that serve those who are hardest hit by persistent patterns of inequity in areas central to daily living such as housing, health, employment, education, economic investment, transportation, and public safety.
 Building Pathways to Stability: To support organizations whose core work is to provide essential services in preventing and ending homelessness, decreasing food insecurity, increasing access to health care and providing emergency clothing and supplies.

Affinity Funds 
African American Legacy, launched in 2003, engages African Americans in philanthropy to support grassroots and nonprofit organizations working to improve the quality of life among African Americans in metropolitan Chicago.
Asian Giving Circle, established in 2002, convenes professionals and distributes grants to leverage impact on issues of common concern within Asian American communities.
LGBT Community Fund, established in 2010, serves as a tool to educate the region about LGBT issues and promote effective philanthropy to achieve strategic change that improves LGBT residents’ quality of life.
Nuestro Futuro, created in 2003, promotes Latino philanthropy and pools resources to support organizations and program improving the life of Latinos in metropolitan Chicago.
Disabilities Fund promotes the development of programs, policies, and public action that expands opportunity, inclusion and participation of persons with disabilities in the Chicago region.
Young Leaders Fund, created in 1994, provides young professionals between 25 and 45 years old the opportunity to become more informed and effective donors and leaders by expanding their understanding of active grant making.

Collaborative Funds 
Arts Work Fund
Chicagoland Workforce Funder Alliance
Elevated Chicago
Immigration Funders Collaborative
Partnership for Safe and Peaceful Communities

Supporting Organizations
Illinois Justice Project
Burridge D. Butler Memorial Trust
Glasser and Rosenthal Family Foundation
Lavin Family Supporting Foundation
PERT Foundation
Springboard Foundation

See also 
 Silicon Valley Community Foundation, another community foundation in the United States

References

External links 

 Chicago Community Trust Excellence in Dance Initiatives Records at Newberry Library

Community foundations based in the United States